Down Home is an album by American jazz tenor saxophonist Zoot Sims.

Reception 
Billboard magazine called it an "unusual album", in that Sims "applied his improvisational skill to a number of real oldies". The magazine reviewed the singles as well, noting the "all-star rhythm section" and generally saying the songs were "perfect for jazz jukeboxes". Down Beat called it "a marvellous example of Sims' ability to swing".

Scott Yanow, writing for AllMusic, called it "enjoyable and consistently swinging", noting that it "gives one a look at the great pianist Dave McKenna in his early days". The Penguin Guide to Jazz described it as "a classic Zoot date, with the saxophonist swinging as hard as ever and McKenna offering his characteristic full-blooded support".

Track listing

Personnel 
Zoot Sims – tenor saxophone
Dave McKenna – piano
George Tucker – double bass
Dannie Richmond – drums

References 

Albums produced by Teddy Charles
Zoot Sims albums
1960 albums
Bethlehem Records albums